The Canadian Multiculturalism Act is a law of Canada, passed in 1988, that aims to preserve and enhance cultural diversity, i.e. multiculturalism, in Canada.

Background

On 8 October 1971,  Prime Minister Pierre Elliott Trudeau declared in the House of Commons of Canada that, after much deliberation, the policies of bilingualism and multiculturalism would be implemented in Canada. In other words, the Government of Canada would recognize and respect its society including its diversity in languages, customs, religions, and so on. According to Immigration, Refugees and Citizenship Canada (IRCC): "In 1971, Canada was the first country in the world to adopt multiculturalism as an official policy." One result of this policy statement was the Canadian Multiculturalism Act of 1985.

In 1982, multiculturalism was recognized by section 27 of the Canadian Charter of Rights and Freedoms, and the Canadian Multiculturalism Act was subsequently enacted by Prime Minister Brian Mulroney.

Details 
The preamble of the act declares that,

The multiculturalism policy allows citizens to practice their religions and keep their identities without the fear of official persecution. It is believed by some that without this fear, Canadians are more willing to accept different cultures. The policy, therefore, emphasizes a mutual respect between ethnicities and also acceptance of one's personal beliefs.

This policy guarantees equality before the law and for pursuing opportunities whether personal, career, or in any other field. This means anyone of any race or ethnic origin is capable of pursuing his or her interests without persecution. Canadian law, as a result, reflects many of these rights and belief as they guaranteed to all men and women. All of these rights are guaranteed in the Canadian Charter of Rights and Freedoms which is part of the Canadian Constitution.

The Parole Board of Canada writes that the act has two fundamental principles: 
 All citizens are equal and have the freedom to preserve, enhance and share their cultural heritage.
 Multiculturalism promotes the full and equitable participation of individuals and communities of all origins in all aspects of Canadian society.

The act binds the federal government and its institutions to encourage, facilitate, assist and undertake several high-minded goals. The Minister may also enter into agreements with provincial and foreign governments to promote these goals. Other ministers may enter into agreements with the provinces.  The "Canadian multiculturalism advisory committee" is established in Section 7, and the Minister is charged with the annual composition of a report on the operation of the act.

Content
The Canadian Multiculturalism Act affirms the policy of the Government of Canada to ensure that every Canadian receives equal treatment by the government which respects and celebrates diversity. The act also:
 recognizes Canada's multicultural heritage and that this heritage must be protected
 recognizes Aboriginal rights
 recognizes English and French remain the only official languages but that other languages may be used
 recognizes equality rights regardless of race, religion, etc.
 recognizes minorities' rights to enjoy their cultures.

Section 3 
Section 3 (1) of the act states:

See also
Multicultural media in Canada
Multiculturalism in Canada

References

Further reading

External links 
 Text in English and in French at the Department of Justice Canada website
 Canadian Multiculturalism Act National Parole Board

Canadian federal legislation
1988 in Canadian law
Immigration to Canada
Multiculturalism in Canada